Diana Marie Lynn (born Dolores Eartha Loehr, July 5, 1926 – December 18, 1971) was an American actress.

Early years
Lynn was born in Los Angeles, California. Her father, Louis Loehr, was an oil supply executive, and her mother, Martha Loehr, was a concert pianist. Lynn was considered a child prodigy. She began taking piano lessons at age 4, and by the age of 12 was playing with the Los Angeles Junior Symphony Orchestra.

Lynn made her film debut playing the piano in They Shall Have Music and was once again back at the keyboard, accompanying Susanna Foster, in There's Magic in Music, when it was decided that she had more potential than she had been allowed to show. Paramount Pictures changed her name to "Diana Lynn" and began casting her in films that allowed her to show her personality and developed her skills as an actress.

Her comedic scenes with Ginger Rogers in The Major and the Minor were well received, and in 1944 she scored an outstanding success in Preston Sturges' The Miracle of Morgan's Creek. She appeared in two Henry Aldrich films and played writer Emily Kimbrough in two films Our Hearts Were Young and Gay and Our Hearts Were Growing Up both co-starring Gail Russell.

After a few more films, she was cast in one of the year's biggest successes, the comedy My Friend Irma with Marie Wilson as Irma, and Dean Martin and Jerry Lewis in their film debuts. The group reprised their roles for the sequel My Friend Irma Goes West, and five years later Lynn was reunited with Martin and Lewis for one of their last films, You're Never Too Young.

During the 1950s, Lynn acted in a number of films, portraying Spencer Tracy's daughter in the crime drama The People Against O'Hara and the female lead in the much lampooned Bedtime for Bonzo opposite Ronald Reagan. Lynn co-starred as the schoolteacher in the 1955 film, The Kentuckian, starring Burt Lancaster and Walter Matthau. 
She also had many TV leading roles during the 1950s, particularly in the middle years of the decade. As a solo pianist, she released at least one single on Capitol Records  with backing by the Paul Weston orchestra.

Stage
In 1964, Lynn had a six-month stint on Broadway, replacing Barbara Bel Geddes in Mary, Mary. In the early 1950s, she starred with Maurice Evans in The Wild Duck on Broadway.

She also starred in runs of The Moon Is Blue in the United States and the United Kingdom.

Recordings
In 1947, a three-record album of Lynn's piano playing included Mozart's Rondo, Laura, and Body and Soul.

Later years
A Democrat, she supported Adlai Stevenson's campaign during the 1952 presidential election. She acted frequently in television guest roles throughout the 1960s. By 1970, she had relocated to New York City, where she was running a travel agency. She appeared in Company of Killers, a film made for television. Paramount then offered her a part in a new film, Play It as It Lays, and after some consideration, Lynn accepted the offer and moved back to Los Angeles.

In 1968, Lynn invited her friend Mart Crowley to housesit for her while she was out of town. While at her house over those five weeks, Crowley wrote the majority of his groundbreaking play about LGBT life in America, The Boys in the Band.

Death
Before filming started on Play It as It Lays, Lynn suffered a stroke and died on December 18, 1971, at the age of 45. Lynn was cremated. A funeral service was held at Church of the Heavenly Rest in New York City, and a memorial service was held at All Saints' Episcopal Church in Beverly Hills, California.

Recognition
In 1942, Parents magazine named Lynn "the most talented juvenile actress." She has two stars on the Hollywood Walk of Fame: for motion pictures, at 1625 Vine Street and for television at 6350 Hollywood Boulevard.

Family
Lynn married architect John C. Lindsay December 18, 1948; they divorced in June 1953.  Lynn was then married in 1956 to Mortimer Hall, son of New York Post publisher Dorothy Schiff.

Lynn's daughter Dolly Hall is a film producer. 

Another daughter, Margaret "Daisy" Hall, is an alumna of the Emma Willard School for Girls in Troy, New York, and as an actress, has starred in numerous French- and lesser-known American-produced films, during the 1980s, '90s, and 2000s.

Partial filmography

They Shall Have Music (1939) – Pianist (uncredited)
The Hard-Boiled Canary (1941) – Dolly Loehr
The Major and the Minor (1942) – Lucy Hill
Star Spangled Rhythm (1942) – Herself (uncredited)
Henry Aldrich Gets Glamour (1943) – Phyllis Michael
The Miracle of Morgan's Creek (1944) – Emmy Kockenlocker
And the Angels Sing (1944) – Josie Angel
Henry Aldrich Plays Cupid (1944) – Phyllis Michael
Our Hearts Were Young and Gay (1944) – Emily Kimbrough
Out of This World (1945) – Betty Miller
Duffy's Tavern (1945) – Diana Lynn
The Bride Wore Boots (1946) – Mary Lou Medford
Our Hearts Were Growing Up (1946) – Emily Kimbrough
Easy Come, Easy Go (1947) – Connie Donovan
Variety Girl (1947) – Diana Lynn
Ruthless (1948) – Martha Burnside / Mallory Flagg
Texas, Brooklyn & Heaven (1948) – Perry Dunklin
Every Girl Should Be Married (1948) – Julie Howard
My Friend Irma (1949) – Jane Stacey
Paid in Full (1950) – Nancy Langley
Rogues of Sherwood Forest (1950) – Lady Marianne de Beaudray
My Friend Irma Goes West (1950) – Jane Stacey
Peggy (1950) – Peggy Brookfield
Bedtime for Bonzo (1951) – Jane Linden
The People Against O'Hara (1951) – Virginia 'Ginny' Curtayne
Meet Me at the Fair (1952) – Zerelda Wing
Plunder of the Sun (1953) – Julie Barnes
Track of the Cat (1954) – Gwen Williams
An Annapolis Story (1955) – Peggy Lord
You're Never Too Young (1955) – Nancy Collins
The Kentuckian (1955) – Susie Spann
Company of Killers (1970, TV Movie) – Edwina DeSalles (final film role)

Television

The Investigators (1961) – episode "In a Mirror, Darkly"

Radio appearances

References

External links

 
 

1926 births
1971 deaths
20th-century American actresses
American film actresses
American stage actresses
American television actresses
Actresses from California
Capitol Records artists
Paramount Pictures contract players
Schiff family
20th-century American women pianists
20th-century American pianists
California Democrats
New York (state) Democrats
Emma Willard School alumni
20th-century American Episcopalians